Mago Island (pronounced ) is a volcanic island that lies in the northwest sector of Fiji's northern Lau Group of islands. The island is privately owned by actor/director Mel Gibson.

Mago is located 166 statute miles ENE of the Fiji capital of Suva and  SW of the tiny island of Namalata, near Vanua Balavu, where descendants of original Mago inhabitants still reside. Mago Island is relatively undeveloped at present and inhabited only by a few caretakers of Indo-Fijian descent.

History 
During the 1860s, a cotton plantation established by the Ryder brothers of Australia flourished there. In 1884 there was a well-established sugar cane plantation plus a sugar mill on the island. The Mill was shut down in 1895 and it was dismantled and used to enlarge the Penang Mill in Ra. The Ryders were succeeded by the Borron family.

In early 2005 Mago Island was purchased by Hollywood actor/director Mel Gibson for $15 million from Japan's Tokyu Corporation. Descendants of original native inhabitants of Mago, who were displaced in the 1860s, have protested against Gibson's purchase.

Satellite images of the island dating from 2008 show a dirt airstrip of 1100 metres. There is no port on the island; a short stone pier is located on the island's north side. There is only one loosely arranged village on the island whose appearance is more indicative of a resort. Agriculture consists of only a few small areas of fields.

An episode of the NBC sitcom 30 Rock titled "Operation Righteous Cowboy Lightning" (Season 5, Episode 12) featured a story about a disaster on the island. Jack Donaghy, played by Alec Baldwin, decides to air a pre-recorded telethon to benefit the victims of the disaster. However, Donaghy is shocked to learn the only "victims" of the disaster are Mel Gibson and his guest, Jon Gosselin.

References 

Islands of Fiji
Lau Islands
Private islands of Fiji